is a 　mountain, on the border of Matsusaka, Mie and Kawakami, Nara, Japan. This mountain is one of Daikō Mountains.

Routes 

There are two major routes to the top of Mount Myōjin. The route from Maakodani Tozanguchi takes about three hours. The other route is via Myōjindaira from Ōmata Bus Stop of Nara Kōtsu. It takes about three and half hours.

Access 
 Ōmata Bus Stop of Nara Kōtsu

Gallery

References
 Ōdaigahara, Takami, Kurosoyama, Shobunsha, 2008
 Official Home Page of the Geographical Survey Institute in Japan

Mountains of Nara Prefecture
Mountains of Mie Prefecture